Census-designated places (CDPs) are unincorporated communities lacking elected municipal officers and boundaries with legal status. Connecticut has 112 census-designated places. Some CDPs do not have separate pages from their parent town, while others are coterminous with their parent town. Further, some CDPs take the name of their parent town.

Census-designated places

References

Connecticut
Census-designated places in Connecticut